Patdeep or Patdip (पटदीप), is a Hindustani classical raga from the Kafi Thaat.

Theory

Arohana and Avarohana 
Notation: S r R g G M Ḿ P d D n N S

Lower case indicates 'komal' or flat notes, " indicates higher (third) octave, ' indicates lower (first) octave

Arohana: N' S g m P N S'
Avarohana: S" N D P, m P g, m g R S

The raag has Komal Ga.
It is an Audava-Sampoorna raga, implying that it has 5 notes in Arohana and 7 in Avarohana.
Raag Patdeep is formed when pure N is taken instead of komal n in Raag Bhimpalasi. Patdeep is essentially Gowrimanohari sans rishaba and dhaivata in ascent.

Vadi and Samavadi 

Vadi: Pa
Samavadi: Sa

Pakad or Chalan 

Pakad or Chalan: N' S g M P (M) g, M g R S, g M P N S" D P, M P g, M g R S.

Film Compositions

Language:Tamil

Language: Malayalam 

   Anuraga Lola gathri
   Film : Dhwani
   Year : 1988
   Raga : Patdeep
   Composer : Naushad Ali
   Lyricist : Yusafali Kechery
   Singers : K. J. Yesudas & P. Susheela

   Kathirunnu Kathirunnu
   Film : Ennu Ninte Moideen
   Year : 2015
   Raga : Pilu & Patdeep
   Composer : M. Jayachandran
   Lyricist : Rafeeq Ahammed
   Singer   : Shreya Ghoshal

Organization and relationships 

Related ragas:
Dhanashree, Dhani, Bhimpalasi, Hamsakinkini, Gourimanohari, Madhuvanti
Thaat: Kafi
'Nyaas'( notes of rest): g,P and N

'Prakity'( behavior): Chanchal( fast).

References

External links 

Hindustani ragas